Mike or Michael Snow may refer to:

Michael Snow, Canadian visual artist
Mike Snow (politician), member of the Georgia House of Representatives
Mike Snow (auto racer) in 1992 Indy Lights season
 Michael Snow, competitor from Survivor: Caramoan (2013)
 Michael Snow, founder of The Signpost and former WMF Board member
Mike Snow, guitarist in The Generators
Michael Snow, character in I Do! I Do!

See also
Miike Snow, a Swedish indie pop band
Miike Snow (album), Miike Snow's first album